Gary Alan Sinise (born March 17, 1955) is an American actor, humanitarian, and musician. Among other awards, he has won a Primetime Emmy Award, a Golden Globe Award, a Tony Award, and four Screen Actors Guild Awards. He has also received a star on the Hollywood Walk of Fame, and was nominated for an Academy Award. Sinise has also received numerous awards and honors for his extensive humanitarian work and involvement with charitable organizations. He is a supporter of various veterans' organizations and founded the Lt. Dan Band (named after his character in Forrest Gump), which plays at military bases around the world.

Sinise's acting career started on stage with the Steppenwolf Theatre Company in 1983 when he directed and starred in a production of Sam Shepard's True West for which he earned an Obie Award. He would later earn four Tony Award nominations including for his performances in The Grapes of Wrath and One Flew Over the Cuckoo's Nest. He earned the Tony Award's Regional Theatre Award alongside the Steppenwolf Theatre Company. 

Sinise first starred in the film adaptation of John Steinbeck's classic novel Of Mice and Men which he also directed and produced. Sinise played George Milton alongside John Malkovich who played Lennie. Subsequent roles include Lieutenant Dan Taylor in Forrest Gump (1994) for which he was nominated for the Academy Award for Best Supporting Actor. He also appeared in films such as Ron Howard's Apollo 13 (1995), Ransom (1996), Frank Darabont's The Green Mile (1999) and Impostor (2002). 

He is also known for his television performances as Harry S. Truman in Truman (1995), for which he won a Golden Globe, and the title role in the television film George Wallace, for which he received a Primetime Emmy Award. He later had leading roles as Detective Mac Taylor in the CBS series CSI: NY (2004–13), from 2016 to 2017, Sinise starred as Special Agent Jack Garrett in Criminal Minds: Beyond Borders.

Early life
Sinise was born in Blue Island, Illinois, son of Robert L. Sinise (born 1931), a film editor, and Mylles (Alsip) Sinise. His paternal grandfather was of Italian descent, Sinise's great-grandfather Vito Sinisi having emigrated from Ripacandida, in the Italian region of Basilicata. Sinise briefly attended Glenbard West High School in Glen Ellyn, Illinois, and later graduated from Highland Park High School in Highland Park, Illinois.

In 1974, Sinise and two friends, Terry Kinney and Jeff Perry, founded the Steppenwolf Theatre Company. Since then, Steppenwolf has showcased the talents of notable actors such as Joan Allen, Kevin Anderson, Gary Cole, Ethan Hawke, Glenne Headly, John Malkovich, John Mahoney, Laurie Metcalf, Martha Plimpton, Jim True-Frost, and William Petersen. Sinise honed his acting and directing skills at Steppenwolf, and received a Joseph Jefferson Award for his direction of Lyle Kessler's play Orphans. That took him from Chicago to New York City, and then to London's West End, where he worked on more than thirty of the company's productions.

Career

In 1982, Sinise's career began to take off when he directed and starred in Steppenwolf's production of True West. In 1983, he earned an Obie Award for his direction, and a year later appeared with John Malkovich in the PBS' American Playhouse production of the play. In 1988, Sinise directed Miles from Home, a film starring Richard Gere, about two brothers' fight against the foreclosure of the family farm. Sinise collaborated with fellow actor Tom Hanks three times, including Forrest Gump, Apollo 13, and The Green Mile. Other noteworthy films in which Sinise has appeared include  Of Mice and Men (which he directed), Reindeer Games, Snake Eyes, Ransom, Mission to Mars, The Stand and Impostor. He narrated the audiobooks for John Steinbeck's Travels with Charley.

In 2004, he began his first regular television series, in the crime drama CSI: New York, in which he plays Detective Mac Taylor. He was credited as a producer from season two onwards and wrote the storyline of an episode. Several episodes have allowed Sinise to demonstrate his musical prowess, including a season-two episode where Mac Taylor plays the bass guitar in a jazz club with musicians Kimo and Carol Williams and Danny Gottlieb, members of the Lt. Dan Band, which Sinise and Kimo Williams co-founded in 2003. The band is named for Sinise's character in Forrest Gump.

Apart from his television and movie work, Sinise used to be the host in the video for the Epcot ride Mission: SPACE, at Walt Disney World, Orlando, Florida, and a model for Baume & Mercier watches. He co-founded Operation Iraqi Children. Sinise said, "Iraq is in the news every day, and most of it is bad. But there are some positive stories. And how our soldiers are rebuilding schools and helping kids is one of them."

Sinise was the narrator for the Discovery Channel's miniseries When We Left Earth in 2008. He was awarded the Presidential Citizen Medal by George W. Bush for work he did supporting the U.S. military and humanitarian work supporting Iraqi children. He narrated Army and Army Reserve Army Strong recruitment ads in late 2008. He is also the national spokesperson for the American Veterans Disabled for Life Memorial.

Sinise is the executive producer—along with David Scantling—of the Iraq War documentary Brothers at War.  The film features an American military family and the experiences of three brothers: Jake Rademacher, Isaac Rademacher, and Joseph Rademacher.

In November 2009, Sinise narrated the highly acclaimed World War II in HD on the History Channel. In 2010, he narrated the World War II documentary Missions That Changed The War on the Military Channel. In late 2002, he started the Cadillac commercials starting with the 2002–2003 Season's Best commercial and has been with the Break Through campaign since it started the campaign in the 2002 Super Bowl with Led Zeppelin's "Rock and Roll" then ended in late 2006. In 2009, Sinise lent his voice talents in the Thomas Nelson audio Bible production known as The Word of Promise, playing the character of David.

On April 17, 2017, Sinise received a star on the Hollywood Walk of Fame for his work in the television industry, located at 6664 Hollywood Boulevard.

On October 30, 2017, Sinise was selected as Grand Marshal of the Pasadena Tournament of Roses Parade, which took place on January 1, 2018.

Filmography

Film

Television

Theatre

Video games

Personal life

Sinise married actress Moira Harris in 1981. They have three children. In 2003, Sinise was awarded an honorary Doctorate of Humane Letters by Amherst College. He was awarded the U.S. Presidential Citizens Medal by President George W. Bush in 2008.

Sinise is a devoted fan of the Chicago Cubs and the Chicago Bears. He also is a fan of the band Kansas.

Sinise is a practicing Catholic. He converted to the faith on December 24, 2010. His wife, Moira, converted in 2000.

Politics
In 2005, Sinise founded Friends of Abe, a support and networking group for conservative members of Hollywood.

Sinise's name was in an advertisement in the Los Angeles Times (August 17, 2006) that condemned Hamas and Hezbollah and supported Israel in the 2006 Israel-Lebanon conflict. In June 2008, Sinise donated $2,300 to the Republican presidential primary campaign of Arizona Senator John McCain. Nicolle Wallace, a former adviser to George W. Bush and McCain's campaign adviser, stated in May 2009 that she believed Sinise could help bring about a resurgence of the Republican Party. Wallace stated, "The natural strengths that an actor brings to politics would come in handy to anyone going up against Obama in 2012. We will need an effective communicator who can stand toe to toe with Obama's eloquence." Other names mentioned were those of Generals David Petraeus and Ray Odierno. Sinise narrates the online virtual tour for the Ronald Reagan Presidential Library and spoke at the centennial celebration of Ronald Reagan's birth at the library in February 2011.

In September 2012, Sinise donated to Republican presidential nominee Mitt Romney. Sinise's Republican-leaning has been written into the character of Mac Taylor (played by Sinise on CSI: NY), who has a picture of Reagan displayed in his office and was once the subject of a joke by one of his colleagues about an eight-hour Reagan documentary he watched over and over.
In spite of being a lifelong supporter of the Republican Party, Sinise refused to endorse or vote for Donald Trump in the 2016 presidential election, and also criticized Trump after the then-candidate questioned McCain's status as a war hero because he was captured as a prisoner of war.

Humanitarian work

Sinise is a supporter of various veterans' organizations, both personally and through the Lt. Dan Band. He frequently performs on USO tours at military bases around the world, and volunteered for the National Vietnam Veterans Arts Museum now called the National Veterans Art Museum.

Sinise is also on the Advisory Council of Hope For The Warriors, a national nonprofit dedicated to provide a full cycle of nonmedical care to combat-wounded service members, their families, and families of the fallen from each military branch. Sinise narrates the audiobook of John Steinbeck's "Of Mice and Men," which was released on April 13, 2011. In December 2011, Sinise was the narrator at the Candelight Processional at Disneyland.

In August 2012, Sinise was honored at the United States Navy Memorial, by Master Chief Petty Officer of the Navy (MCPON) Rick West, and was made an honorary U.S. Navy Chief Petty Officer for his efforts in helping veterans. On August 29, 2013, he was named an honorary Marine by the Commandant of the Marine Corps. In 2006, Sinise began co-hosting the National Memorial Day Concert on the Mall in Washington, D.C., with actor and Illinois native Joe Mantegna.

He serves as the national spokesperson for the American Veterans Disabled for Life Memorial and spends much of his time raising awareness for the memorial and other veterans' service organizations. In 2012, he was honored by the Joe Foss Institute for his dedication to veterans.

In 2013, he was awarded the third highest honor within the Department of the Army Civilian Awards, the Outstanding Civilian Service Award, for substantial contributions to the U.S. Army community through his work with the Gary Sinise Foundation. Each year the foundation raises over $30 million which it uses to benefit military veterans, including building smart homes for those who are disabled. He participated in Troopathon VI for 2013, as he has in the past, to help raise money for care packages for American troops.

He received the 2015 Sylvanus Thayer Award, awarded by the West Point Association of Graduates to a non-West Point graduate whose character, service, and achievements reflect the ideals prized by the U.S. Military Academy.

In 2019 a video went viral of Gary Sinise reacting to a video of active duty service men and women, veterans, first responders, their families, and Colin Powell, Tom Hanks, Robert De Niro, Ron Howard, Steve Buscemi, Jay Leno, Tim Allen, Rob Lowe, Judd Apatow and Robin Roberts giving thanks to Sinise for all his humanitarian work.

In 2020, the Location Managers Guild honored Sinise with its Humanitarian award at their annual awards ceremony in recognition of the work he does with the Gary Sinise Foundation. In accepting the award. Sinise read a quote from President Calvin Coolidge saying, "The nation which forgets its defenders will itself be forgotten".

On April 16, 2021, Sinise hosted the inauguration ceremony of the World War I memorial in Washington D.C.

Awards and honors 

Over the years, Sinise has received numerous honors for his humanitarian work and his work on behalf of military veterans and families.

Bibliography

References

External links

 
 
 
 

1955 births
Living people
20th-century American guitarists
20th-century American male actors
20th-century American male musicians
21st-century American guitarists
21st-century American male actors
21st-century American male musicians
21st-century Roman Catholics
American bass guitarists
American people of Italian descent
American male bass guitarists
American male film actors
American male guitarists
American male television actors
American male video game actors
American male voice actors
American Roman Catholics
American television directors
Audiobook narrators
Best Miniseries or Television Movie Actor Golden Globe winners
California Republicans
Catholics from California
Film directors from California
Film directors from Illinois
Guitarists from Illinois
Guitarists from Los Angeles
Illinois Republicans
Illinois State University alumni
Lt. Dan Band members
Male actors from Illinois
Obie Award recipients
Outstanding Performance by a Cast in a Motion Picture Screen Actors Guild Award winners
Outstanding Performance by a Lead Actor in a Miniseries or Movie Primetime Emmy Award winners
Outstanding Performance by a Male Actor in a Miniseries or Television Movie Screen Actors Guild Award winners
People from Blue Island, Illinois
People from Greater Los Angeles
Presidential Citizens Medal recipients
Steppenwolf Theatre Company players
Television producers from California
Television producers from Illinois
United Service Organizations entertainers